Roger & Me is a 1989 American documentary film written, produced, directed by, and starring Michael Moore, in his directorial debut. Moore portrays the regional economic impact of General Motors CEO Roger Smith's action of closing several auto plants in his hometown of Flint, Michigan, reducing GM's employees in that area from 80,000 in 1978 to about 50,000 in 1992. As of August 2015, GM employs approximately 7,200 workers in the Flint area, according to The Detroit News, and 5,000 workers according to MSNBC.

In 2013, the film was selected for preservation in the United States National Film Registry by the Library of Congress as being "culturally, historically or aesthetically significant".

Synopsis

Moore begins by introducing himself and his family through 8 mm archival home movies; he describes himself as the Irish American Catholic middle-class son of a General Motors employee assembling AC spark plugs. Moore chronicles how GM had previously defined his childhood in Flint, Michigan, and how the company was the primary economic and social hub of the town. He points out that Flint is the place where the Flint sit-down strike occurred, resulting in the birth of the United Auto Workers. He reveals that his heroes were the Flint natives who had escaped the oppressive life in GM's factories, including "Flint's most famous native son", game show host Bob Eubanks.

Initially, Moore achieves his dream of avoiding blue-collared factory life after being hired by Mother Jones magazine in San Francisco, but this venture fails for him and he ultimately travels back to Flint. As he returns (in 1986), GM announces the layoffs of thousands of Flint auto workers, whose jobs will be outsourced to cheaper, non-unionized labor in Mexico. GM makes this announcement even though the company is achieving record profits.

Disguised as a TV journalist, Moore interviews some auto workers in Flint and discovers their strong disgust for GM chairman Roger B. Smith. Moore begins seeking out Smith himself to confront him about the closing of the Flint plants. He tries to visit Smith at the GM headquarters in Detroit, yet he is blocked by building security as Moore hasn't made either an appointment for an interview or his intentions clear. A company spokesman exchanges contact information with Moore, but ultimately refuses to grant Moore an interview due to Moore's lack of credentials and fear of negative portrayal. Over the course of the film, Moore attempts to track down Smith at the Grosse Pointe Yacht Club and the Detroit Athletic Club, only to be told either that Smith is not there or to leave by employees and security guards.

From there, Moore begins to explore the emotional impact of the plant closings on his friends. He interviews Ben Hamper, an auto worker who suffered a nervous breakdown on the assembly line and is residing at a mental health facility. From here, to the Beach Boys song "Wouldn't It Be Nice?", is seen a montage of the urban decay enveloping Flint, interspersed with news reports about increasing layoffs, residents not being able to move out and rapidly increasing rat infestations. Moore also talks to the residents of the affluent suburb of Grand Blanc, who display classist attitudes about Flint's hardships; at a roaring twenties-themed party they are hosting, Moore takes note when they hire laid off workers to be human statues.

Moore changes course and turns his camera on the Flint Convention and Visitors Bureau, which promotes a vigorously incompetent tourism policy. The Bureau, in an effort to lure tourists into visiting Flint, permits the construction of a Hyatt Regency Hotel, a festival marketplace called Water Street Pavilion, and AutoWorld, hailed as the world's largest indoor theme park. All these efforts fail, as the Hyatt files for bankruptcy and is put up for sale, Water Street Pavilion sees most of its stores go out of business, and AutoWorld closes just six months after the grand opening.

High-profile people are shown coming to Flint to bring hope to the unemployed, some of them interviewed by Moore. President Ronald Reagan visits the town and suggests that the unemployed auto workers find work by moving across the country, though the restaurant he visits has its cash register stolen during the event (off-camera). The Flint mayor pays television evangelist Robert Schuller to preach to the town's unemployed. Pat Boone and Anita Bryant, who have supplied GM with celebrity endorsements, also come to town; Boone tells Moore that Smith is a "can-do" kind of guy. Moore also interviews Bob Eubanks during a fair near Flint, during which Eubanks cracks a joke about Jewish women and AIDS.

Moore attends the annual GM shareholder meeting, disguised as a shareholder himself. However, when he gets a turn at the microphone to air his grievances to the board, Smith appears to recognize Moore and immediately shuts him out and has the convention adjourned, despite Moore's attempts to interrupt him. In a close-up of Smith, he is heard joking about his action with a fellow board member before leaving. Meanwhile, Moore meets and interviews more residents of Flint, who are reeling from the economic fallout of the layoffs. A former feminist radio host, Janet, joins Amway as a saleswoman to find work. Another resident, Rhonda Britton, sells rabbits for "Pets or Meat". Britton is featured killing a rabbit by beating it with a lead pipe. Prevalent throughout the film is Sheriff's Deputy Fred Ross, a former factory worker whose current job now demands that he go around town carrying out record numbers of evictions on families unable to pay their rent.

During all of this, Flint's crime rate skyrockets, with shootouts and murders becoming much more common. Crime becomes so prevalent that when the ABC News program Nightline tries to do a live story on the plant closings, someone steals the network's van (along with the cables), abruptly stopping the broadcast. The county jail also fills to its maximum capacity of inmates. A second jail is built due to the over-crowding. Living in Flint becomes so desperate that Money magazine ranks the city as the worst place to live in America. The residents react with outrage and stage a rally where issues of Money magazine are burned. The residents play the song "My Hometown" by Bruce Springsteen during the rally, seemingly unaware that the song is about a town becoming overcome by crime and poverty.

At the film's climax, Moore finally confronts Smith at the chairman's annual 1988 Christmas message in Detroit. Smith is shown expounding about generosity during the holiday season, concurrently as Deputy Ross evicts another family from their home. After Smith's speech, Moore hounds Smith, addressing him from a distance. The face-to-face encounter between Moore and Smith is shown as this:

Dejected by his failure to bring Smith to Flint, Moore proclaims in the final shot, "As we neared the end of the twentieth century, the rich got richer, the poor poorer, and people everywhere now had a lot less lint, thanks to the lint rollers made in my hometown. It was truly the dawn of a new era." After the credits, the film displays the message "This film cannot be shown within the city of Flint", followed by "All the movie theatres have closed".

Production
Moore decided to make the film after losing his job as the editor of Mother Jones and moving back to his former home town of Flint, Michigan, as it was suffering from deindustrialization due to General Motors' layoffs. After his attempt to restart the Flint Voice newspaper faltered, Moore decided to make a documentary on the city's economic crisis. Initially he intended to make it under the title The Moores and the Motts contrasting his working-class family with the upper-class family descended from Charles Stewart Mott, but later shifted focus to the current U.S. automobile industry. Moore intended the film as a personal statement condemning not just GM but also the economic policies and social attitudes of the Reagan era, which he felt allowed corporations to remove the largest source of income from an entire town.

At the time Moore decided to make the documentary in 1984, he had no experience in filmmaking or funds to produce the film. To get the money, he filed a successful wrongful termination lawsuit against Mother Jones for $160,000. He also mortgaged his house, sold most of his belongings, and arranged a three-year series of weekly bingo gains to raise the remainder of the film's $200,000 budget. He also began teaching himself film technique, spending hours at local cinemas. Eventually Moore received grant awards from the J. Roderick MacArthur Foundation, the Channel Four Television Corporation, the Michigan Council for the Arts, and Ralph Nader. The Mackinac Center donated $5,000 to the film but later requested it to be refunded. Nader also requested that the $30,000 he donated to the production be returned. He claimed that the nonprofit group Essential Information had donated the funds with the understanding that Moore would start a newsletter that never operated, and also accused Moore of plagiarizing the film from his book The Big Boys.

Roger & Me was filmed under the working title A Humorous Look at How General Motors Destroyed Flint, Michigan. Moore and his crew decided after viewing a 15-minute bumper from the film that the depiction of mass unemployment would be too depressing for mainstream audiences, and decided to give it a humorous slant. Production began on February 11, 1987, on the 50th anniversary of the Flint sit-down strike. A large proportion of the filming was done in a 60-day period during the summer of 1988. Moore obtained interviews by pretending to be filming University of Michigan videos on poverty or booster films promoting the city. The production concluded in August 1989.

Release
The film had its worldwide premiere at the Toronto International Film Festival in September 1989.  It was well received by the Canadian audience with it winning the coveted TIFF People's Choice Award. Coincidentally, only a few weeks later, GM would announce the closing of their Toronto truck assembly plant moving vehicle production to a plant in Flint, Michigan.

Moore briefly entered negotiations with Disney to distribute the film, meeting with CEO Michael Eisner. Warner Bros. gave Moore $3 million for distribution license, a very large amount for a first-time filmmaker and at the time unprecedented for any documentary. Part of the distribution deal required Warner Bros. to pay $25,000 in rent for two years for the families evicted in the film. Moore also donated 20,000 free tickets to unemployed Americans, stipulated that between 30 and 40 percent of his and the producers' profits would be donated to a new non-profit foundation supporting similar political documentaries.

To promote the film's planned national release in 965 theaters, Moore and the film's crew toured 65 GM plants around the country making demands such as a visit by Smith to Flint. During the film's marketing GM and some commentators challenged the veracity of the film's claims. GM refused to allow advertisements to its automobiles to play during television programs promoting the film, including an episode of The Phil Donahue Show filmed live at the Whiting Auditorium and an episode of The Tonight Show Starring Johnny Carson featuring Moore as a guest. After Moore's appearance, GM's media relations chief Bill Ott mailed guest host Jay Leno a packet of news articles challenging his claims.

The film premiered in Flint on December 19, 1989, and was released in New York City and Los Angeles one day later. It went on to become America's most successful documentary in its theatrical run and enjoyed wide critical acclaim, earning $12 million. Moore used $1 million of the film's gross to donate to charities such as the National Union of the Homeless, Earth First!, the Jewish Women's Coalition to End the Occupation, and the United Auto Workers faction New Directions. He also allocated $10,000 to rent payments or homeless shelters around Flint, and $20,000 to revive the Flint Voice.

Despite its success, the film was not nominated for the Best Documentary Feature Academy Award in 1990. The film's lack of a nomination was controversial. On the night of the 62nd Academy Awards Moore attended a ceremony arranged by homelessness activists across the street which presented him with a "People's Award." Three years later, an anonymous member of the Academy of Motion Picture Arts and Sciences confirmed to The Los Angeles Times that the film was deliberately not nominated because the documentary committee believed it was "dishonest and unfair to its subjects".

Reaction to the film
Despite the company's public opposition to the film, its humorous and out-of-touch portrayal of Smith made it widely popular inside GM. By the time of the film's release, GM had lost 8% of its market share and was taking on significant financial losses, leading many employees and executives to become disillusioned with Smith's leadership.

By the time the film was released, Flint was making a slight economic recovery in which unemployment, violent crime, and the local government's budget deficit declined. As a result, many commentators questioned the veracity of the film, accusing Moore of falsifying or embellishing details.

Larry Stecco, a GM lawyer who discussed Flint's local ballet and hockey in front of two African-American human statues, alleged that the film's unflattering portrayal of him had been unfair. Stecco filed a lawsuit against Moore and Warner Bros, claiming that Moore had falsely told him he was making a booster film for Flint's local Public Broadcasting Service affiliate. After reviewing outtakes from the film, a jury sided with Stecco and ordered Moore to pay $6,250. Moore later expressed satisfaction with the decision since the slander charges were dismissed and because the settlement was less than the sought-after $50,000.

Legacy
Moore allowed the film to be aired on television for the first time as part of the PBS series P.O.V. in 1992. The broadcast included a new short documentary by Moore called Pets or Meat: The Return to Flint (1992), which served as a new epilogue. In this film, Moore returns to Flint two years after the release of Roger & Me to see what changes have taken place. Moore revisits Flint and its economic decline again in later films, including The Big One, Bowling for Columbine, Fahrenheit 9/11, Fahrenheit 11/9, and Capitalism: A Love Story. In 2013, the film was selected for preservation in the National Film Registry by the Library of Congress for being "culturally, historically, and aesthetically significant".

Critical reception

The film received overwhelmingly positive reviews from critics. Film critic Pauline Kael felt the film exaggerated the social impact of GM's closing of the plant and depicted the actual events of Flint's troubles out of chronological order. Kael called the film "shallow and facetious, a piece of gonzo demagoguery that made me feel cheap for laughing". One such criticism is that the eviction at the end of the film occurred on a different day from Smith's speech, but the two events were intercut for emotional effect. Filmmaker Emile de Antonio was also critical of the film as well. Siskel and Ebert both put the film on their lists of The 10 Best Films of 1989.

One of the largest controversies over the film were the rumors that Moore had successfully filmed an interview with Smith and omitted it from the final cut. The controversy reemerged in 2007 during the promotion of his documentary Sicko and the release of the rival documentary Manufacturing Dissent, which featured a brief clip of a question-and-answer exchange between Moore and Smith at a 1987 GM shareholders' meeting. Moore subsequently acknowledged the encounter but claimed that it had concerned a separate topic unrelated to the film. He accused the critics of fabricating the event to discredit him, and claimed that if he had omitted footage of an interview with GM would have used it to discredit the film.  However, in a 2014 MLive article released to commemorate the film's 25th anniversary, numerous crew members and interviewees of the film alleged that the interview actually had been filmed for the production. They said that Smith agreed to a short interview of approximately 10 questions. The film's cinematographer Bruce Schermer claimed that Smith agreed to a short interview of approximately 10 questions. He suggested that it had been cut because Smith refused to answer Moore's question of how many jobs Flint would lose as a result of GM's business strategy and because he otherwise gave "pretty boring answers".

Critic Billy Stevenson described the film as Moore's "most astonishing", arguing it represents an effort to conflate film-making and labor, and that "it's this fusion of film-making and work that allows Moore to fully convey the desecration of Flint without ever transforming it into a sublime or melancholy poverty-spectacle, thereby distancing himself from the retouristing of the town-as-simulacrum that occupies the last and most intriguing part of the film".

Awards
The film would go on to win over 14 awards in the years since its release including:

See also

 Pets or Meat: The Return to Flint
 Final Offer – a documentary film that shows the backroom 1984 General Motors contract negotiations that would result in the union split of the Canadian arm of the UAW. It also shows how the UAW was more willing to negotiate with General Motors than their Canadian counterparts. The film depicts some of the events that would lead to the closing of plants in Flint and other plants around the United States. GM Chairman Roger Smith is featured in the film.
 The Corporation – the 2003 Canadian documentary film shows the history of the corporation and some of its potential downfalls. Michael Moore appears in the film.

Further reading

References

External links

 
 
 
 Roger & Me online museum

1989 films
1989 documentary films
1989 independent films
American documentary films
Documentary films about labor relations in the United States
Documentary films about Michigan
Documentary films about American politics
Documentary films about the automotive industry
Films directed by Michael Moore
Film controversies
Flint, Michigan
General Motors
United States National Film Registry films
Warner Bros. films
Termination of employment in popular culture
Mass media portrayals of the working class
1989 directorial debut films
1980s English-language films
Films shot in Michigan
Films shot in Detroit
Films set in Detroit
Films set in Michigan
1980s American films
Films about companies
Toronto International Film Festival People's Choice Award winners